113390 Helvetia, provisional designation , is a background asteroid from the inner regions of the asteroid belt, approximately  kilometers in diameter. It was discovered on 29 September 2002, by Swiss astronomer Markus Griesser at the Eschenberg Observatory in Winterthur, near Zürich, Switzerland. The presumed stony Florian asteroid was named after the Swiss national symbol, Helvetia.

Orbit and classification 

Helvetia is a non-family asteroid of the main belt's background population when applying the hierarchical clustering method to its proper orbital elements. Based on osculating Keplerian orbital elements, the asteroid has also been classified as a member of the Flora family, a giant asteroid family and the largest family of stony asteroids in the main-belt.

It orbits the Sun in the inner main-belt at a distance of 1.8–2.8 AU once every 3 years and 6 months (1,276 days; semi-major axis of 2.3 AU). Its orbits the Sun in the inner main-belt at a distance of 1.8–2.8 AU once every 3 years and 6 months (1,277 days; semi-major axis of 2.3 AU). Its orbit has an eccentricity of 0.20 and an inclination of 7° with respect to the ecliptic. The asteroid's observation arc begins 42 years prior to its official discovery observation, with a precovery taken at the Palomar Observatory in September 1960.

Naming 

This minor planet bears the name for Switzerland, where the asteroid was discovered. Helvetia is also an allegorical figure and symbol for the nation (national personification). Each Swiss stamp carries her name, and her figure appears on most Swiss coins. The official  was published by the Minor Planet Center on 19 February 2006.

Physical characteristics 

Helvetia is an assumed, stony S-type asteroid, the most common type in the inner main-belt and the Flora family's overall spectral type.

Lightcurve 

In April 2014, Helvetia was photometrically observed by Hungarian astronomers Gyula M. Szabó and Krisztián Sárneczky. However, no rotational lightcurve could be obtained. As of 2019, the asteroid's rotation period and shape still remain unknown.

Diameter and albedo 

According to the survey carried out by the NEOWISE mission of NASA's space-based Wide-field Infrared Survey Explorer, Helvetia measures 2.2 kilometers in diameter and its surface has an albedo of 0.23, which is typical for stony asteroids. The Collaborative Asteroid Lightcurve Link assumes an albedo of 0.24 – derived from 8 Flora, the largest member and namesake of its family – and calculates a diameter of 2.06 kilometers based on an absolute magnitude of 15.6.

References

External links 
 Eschenberg Observatory – website
 Discovery image with HIP 4703 (brightest star) at Eschenberg Observatory (2002) 
 Asteroid Lightcurve Database (LCDB), query form (info )
 Dictionary of Minor Planet Names, Google books
 
 

113390
Discoveries by Markus Griesser (astronomer)
Named minor planets
20020929